Edwardian architecture is a Neo-Baroque architectural style that was popular in the British Empire during the Edwardian era (1901–1910). Architecture up to the year 1914 may also be included in this style.

Description
Edwardian architecture is generally less ornate than high or late Victorian architecture, apart from a subset – used for major buildings – known as Edwardian Baroque architecture.

The Victorian Society campaigns to preserve architecture built between 1837 and 1914, and so includes Edwardian as well as Victorian architecture within its remit.

Characteristics 
The characteristic features of the Edwardian Baroque style were drawn from two main sources: the architecture of France during the 18th century and that of Sir Christopher Wren in England during the 17th—part of the English Baroque (for this reason Edwardian Baroque is sometimes referred to as "Wrenaissance"). Sir Edwin Lutyens was a major exponent, designing many commercial buildings in what he termed 'the Grand Style' during the later 1910s and 1920s. This period of British architectural history is considered a particularly retrospective one, since it is contemporary with Art Nouveau.

Typical details of Edwardian Baroque architecture include extensive rustication, usually more extreme at ground level, often running into and exaggerating the voussoirs of arched openings (derived from French models); domed corner rooftop pavilions and a central taller tower-like element creating a lively rooftop silhouette; revived Italian Baroque elements such as exaggerated keystones, segmental arched pediments, columns with engaged blocks, attached block-like rustication to window surrounds; colonnades of (sometimes paired) columns in the Ionic order and domed towers modelled closely on Wren's for the Royal Naval College in Greenwich. Some Edwardian Baroque buildings include details from other sources, such as the Dutch gables of Norman Shaw's Piccadilly Hotel in London.

 

Other characteristics include:
 Colour: lighter colours were used; the use of gas and later electric lights caused designers to be less concerned about the need to disguise soot buildup on walls compared to Victorian era architecture.
 Patterns: "Decorative patterns were less complex; both wallpaper and curtain designs were more plain."
 Clutter: "There was less clutter than in the Victorian era. Ornaments were perhaps grouped rather than everywhere."

Architectural influences 
 Victorian
 Art Nouveau
 Georgian
Arts and Crafts
Federation

Notable examples

United Kingdom
 Admiralty Arch, London (1912)
 Albert Hall, Manchester (1910)
 Albert Hall, Nottingham (1910)
 Arding & Hobbs, London (1910)
 Ashton Memorial, Lancaster, by John Belcher (1909)
 Asia House, Manchester (1909)
 Australia House, London (1918)
 Belfast City Hall, Belfast, by Brumwell Thomas (1906)
 Blythe House, London, by Henry Tanner (1903) 
 Bridgewater House, Manchester (1912)
 Cardiff City Hall, Cardiff, by Henry Vaughan Lanchester, Edwin Alfred Rickards & James A. Stewart, (1906)
 Cardiff Crown Court, Cardiff, by Henry Vaughan Lanchester, Edwin Alfred Rickards & James A. Stewart, (1906)
 Central Criminal Court (Old Bailey), London, by Edward William Mountford (1902–07) 
 County Hall, London (1922)
 Electric Cinema, London (1910)
 Government Offices Great George Street, London, by John Brydon, (1908–17)
 Granton Gasworks railway station (1902)
 Hanover Building, Manchester (1909)
 Hove Library, Hove (1907–08)
 India House, Manchester (1906)
 Laing Art Gallery, Newcastle upon Tyne (1904)
 Lancaster House, Manchester (1910)
 London Road Fire and Police Station, Manchester (1906)
 Lloyds Bank on King Street, Manchester by Charles Heathcote (1915)
 Manchester Victoria station, Manchester (1909)
 Marylebone station, London. (1899)
 Midland Bank head office building, London by Edwin Lutyens (1922)
 Mitchell Library, Glasgow, William B Whitie (1906–11)
 Municipal Technical Institute, a.k.a. Blackman Tech, Belfast (1906)
 Nottingham railway station, Nottingham (1904)
 163 North Street, Brighton (1904)
 Port of Liverpool Building, Liverpool, by Sir Arnold Thornely, F.B. Hobbs, Briggs and Wolstenholme (1903–07) 
 Ralli Hall, Hove (1913)
 St. James Buildings, Manchester (1912)
 South Shields Town Hall, South Shields (1905–10)
 Stockport Town Hall, Stockport, by Brumwell Thomas (1908)
 War Office, London (1906)
 Westminster Central Hall, by Henry Vaughan Lanchester, Edwin Alfred Rickards & James A. Stewart, London (1911)

Argentina
 Thompson Muebles Ltd, Buenos Aires (1914)
 Harrods - Bs.As. Ltd, Buenos Aires (1914)
 Retiro Mitre railway station, Buenos Aires (1915)

Australia
 Lands Administration Building, Brisbane (1905)
 Queen Victoria Hospital, Melbourne (main pavilion, now Queen Victoria Women's Centre) (1910-1916)
 Commonwealth Offices, Treasury Place, Melbourne 
 Central Railway Station, Sydney (1906)
 Department of Education building, Sydney (1912)
 General Post Office, Hobart (1905)
 Flinders Street railway station, Melbourne (1909)
 Sydney Hospital, Sydney (1894)
 State Library of New South Wales, Sydney (1905-1910)
 Art Gallery of New South Wales (1897-1909)
 Thomas Walker Convalescent Hospital Buildings, Sydney (1893)
 Taronga Zoo, Sydney (1916)
 Adelaide railway station, Adelaide (1926)
 Perth Institute of Contemporary Arts (1896)
 His Majesty's Theatre, Perth (1904)
 Former Bank of Australasia, Sydney (1904)
 ASN Co building, Sydney (1885)
 Prahran Market, Melbourne (1891)
 Downing Centre (1908)
 Santa Sabina College, Sydney (1894)
 Railway Institute Building, Sydney (1898)
 City Baths, Melbourne (1904)
 Old Museum Building, Brisbane (1891)
 Registrar-General's building, Sydney (1913)
 Exchange Hotel, Kalgoorlie, Western Australia (1900)
 People's Palace, Brisbane (1901)
 Observer Hotel, Sydney (1908)
 International House, Sydney (1913)
 York Hotel, Kalgoorlie (1901)

Canada

 Birkbeck Building, Toronto
 Château Laurier, Ottawa
 Confederation Building, Winnipeg
 Digby Pines, Digby
 Dominion Building, Vancouver
 Flavelle House, Toronto
 Ford Motor Company of Canada warehouse, Calgary
 Fort Garry Hotel, Winnipeg
 Hotel Macdonald, Edmonton
 King Edward Hotel, Toronto
 Palliser Hotel, Calgary
 Post Office (now part of Sinclair Centre), Vancouver
 Sun Tower, Vancouver
 The Empress, Victoria
 Thunder Bay Historical Museum, Thunder Bay

Hong Kong
 Main Building of The University of Hong Kong
 Ohel Leah Synagogue
 Old Dairy Farm Depot
 Western Market
 Old Supreme Court Building

India
 Ripon Building, Chennai
 Chowringhee Mansions, Calcutta
 Rashtrapati Bhavan, New Delhi
 Main Building, The Doon School, Dehradun

Ireland 

Government Buildings, Dublin
Farmleigh, Dublin
Iveagh Buildings, Iveagh Trust, Dublin
Liberties College, Dublin

Malaysia

 City Hall, George Town, Penang (1903)
 Second floor extension to Town Hall, George Town, Penang (1903)
 Former Government Offices (now State Islamic Council building), George Town, Penang (1907)
 Federated Malay States railway station/Malayan Railways building (Wisma Kastam), George Town, Penang by Arthur Benison Hubback (1907)
 George Town Dispensary/Wisma Yeap Chor Ee, George Town, Penang (1922)
 Ipoh Town Hall and former General Post Office, Ipoh, Perak (1916)
 Railway station in Ipoh, Perak by Arthur Benison Hubback (1917 to 1935)
 Former State Secretariat (State Library), Seremban, Negeri Sembilan (1912)

New Zealand
 Auckland Town Hall, Auckland, New Zealand
 General Post Office (former), Auckland, New Zealand
 Auckland Ferry Terminal
 Old Public Trust Building, Wellington (1909)

Singapore
 Victoria Memorial Hall (1905)
 Central Fire Station (1908)
 Saint Joseph's Institution (1900s, 1910s extensions)

Sri Lanka
 Royal College, Colombo

See also
 Edwardian era
 Architecture of London
 Baroque Revival architecture

References

Further reading 
Gray, A. S., Edwardian Architecture: a Biographical Dictionary (1985).
Long, H., The Edwardian House: the Middle-Class Home in Britain 1880–1914 (1993).
Hockman, H.,
Service, A., Edwardian Architecture: Edwardian House Style Handbook (2007) David & Charles  (1977) Thames & Hudson

External links 
Edwardian Architecture (1901-14)
Period Style: Edwardian (1901 to 1910)
Edwardian Baroque Carnegie Libraries in Glasgow, Scotland

 
Colonnades
Baroque Revival architecture
architecture
20th-century architectural styles
British architectural styles
Architecture in England by period or style
1900s in the United Kingdom
1910s in the United Kingdom